Hemispherectomy is a neurosurgical procedure in which a cerebral hemisphere (half of the upper brain, or cerebrum) is removed or disconnected that is used to treat a variety of refractory or drug-resistant seizure disorders (epilepsy). Refractory or drug-resistant epilepsy is defined as seizures that fail to be controlled using 2 or more appropriate anti-seizure medications. About one in three patients with epilepsy have drug-resistant epilepsy and of those, about half of them have focal epilepsy that can potentially be treated with epilepsy surgery. In drug-resistant epilepsy where all or most seizures arise from one hemisphere, hemispherectomy is a highly effective procedure producing seizure freedom in about 80-90% of patients. In addition to controlling seizures and as a result of that, improved development and cognition is also very frequently achieved after hemispherectomy. Most patients who qualify for hemispherectomy already have neurological deficits such as hemibody weakness or loss of vision in one visual field that is opposite to the side of the affected hemisphere. This means that performing hemispherectomy does not add deficits to a new hemisphere in these patients. However, detailed testing is always performed prior to epilepsy surgery in general (including hemispherectomy) to ensure that such procedures would achieve two goals: 1) eliminating or greatly reducing seizures and 2) causing no or minimal deficits that could impair the patient’s functionality.

History and development
A hemispherectomy was first performed by the pioneering neurosurgeon Walter Dandy while at The Johns Hopkins Hospital in 1923 for glioblastoma multiforme. The first account of hemispherectomy used to treat epilepsy was in 1938 by McKenzie in Toronto, Canada. The procedure gained further popularity in the 1950s following a successful series of hemispherectomies in 12 children by South African neurosurgeon Rowland Krynauw and its adoption by the world-renowned Canadian neurosurgeons Wilder Penfield and Theodor Rasmussen at the Montreal Neurological Institute. Up until that point, hemispherectomy was done by completely removing one hemisphere, which is now known as anatomical hemispherectomy.

In the following decades, complications in patients who underwent anatomical hemispherectomy began to be recognized including cerebral hemosiderosis (accumulation of blood in cerebral cortex) and hydrocephalus (excessive cerebrospinal fluid accumulation), which led to a decline in its usage. These complications were believed to be related to the significant amount of brain removed during surgery; therefore, to reduce the risk of complication, Rasmussen developed a modified technique termed “subtotal hemispherectomy” in 1968 that include removing two-thirds to three-quarters of the hemisphere and disconnecting the rest. This resulted in a much lower rate of complications but less effective seizure control, which led Rasmussen to further modify the technique by removing only the central part of the brain and disconnecting the frontal and occipital parts. He called this approach “functionally complete-anatomically total” hemispherectomy. The seizure control results were comparable to anatomical hemispherectomy whereas the complication rate was very low.

Later, further modifications were implemented, all aiming at minimizing the amount of brain tissue removed and instead disconnecting it, including central parasagittal hemispherectomy by Delalande in 1992, periinsular hemispherectomy by Villemure, and transylvian hemispherectomy by Schramm The differences between these techniques was the surgical window used to perform the disconnection, but they all shared excellent seizure outcomes of 80-90% of patients becoming seizure free and minimal complications. These mostly disconnective techniques are now collectively referred to as functional hemispherectomy or hemispherotomy.

The surgical access that is typically used to perform a hemispherectomy is through a craniotomy, which involves making a window in the skull. More recently introduced techniques aim at minimizing this surgical access by utilizing small burr holes to perform “endoscopic hemispherectomy” using either special endoscopic tools. or laser probes to perform the disconnection.

Causes of hemispheric epilepsy
There is a heterogeneous group of pathologies that could cause hemispheric epilepsy and these are typically divided into 3 groups. The first group is congenital pathologies which means that the patient is born with hemisphere that is malformed with abnormal cortex that is capable of seizing. Examples of such pathologies include focal cortical dysplasia, pending megaloencephaly, package area among others. The second group of etiologies is called acquired where an insult or an injury to one half of the brain is sustained early in life, usually around birth. Such etiologies include strokes that affect 1 hemisphere of the brain, hemorrhage (bleeding) or trauma. The third group is termed progressive etiologies and this group includes diseases that develop later in life with a protracted and progressive course. Such etiologies include Rasmussen's encephalitis, Sturge-Weber syndrome and hemispheric brain tumors. All these causes of hemispheric epilepsy have the common feature of a widespread pathology that is strictly or mostly restricted to one hemisphere.

Hemispherectomy workup and patient selection
Patients who have drug-resistant focal epilepsy defined as failing 2 or more medications with seizures arising from 1 hemisphere of the brain qualify to be candidate for hemispherectomy. To confirm this candidacy, a set of tests is required that usually includes electroencephalograph (EEG ), brain imaging in the form of brain magnetic resonance imaging (MRI ) and in certain cases further testing such as positron emission tomography (PET) and functional MRI (fMRI) are also required. The EEG shows the electrical signature of seizures.  Brain MRI helps determine the presence of lesions and their exact location. PET scans help determine the level of metabolism of the brain where areas of the brain that produce seizures typically show a low level of metabolism. Functional MRI helps determine the presence of any functions based on alteration in the blood flow and response to certain tasks. It should be noted, however, that not all tests are required in order to make the determination whether hemispherectomy is applicable or not, rather there is a degree of variation between different patients. The determination of which kind of hemispherectomy procedure is most suitable for a patient depends on multiple factors including the kind of pathology that caused epilepsy, the anatomy of the brain, and the experience of the neurosurgeon. However, anatomical hemispherectomy is almost never utilized anymore given the high rate of complications, rather variations of functional hemispherectomy are the mainstay of treatment.

Outcomes
Hemispherectomy is arguably the most successful surgical procedure among all procedures used to treat epilepsy. Regardless of the kind of hemispherectomy, whether anatomical or functional, seizure freedom is achieved in 80-90% of patients. A recent study compared the different subtypes of functional hemispherectomy and found that they were all equally successful in treating seizures. 
Furthermore, with advancements in surgical techniques, anesthesia and perioperative care, the risks of severe complications such as cerebral hemosiderosis and death have greatly diminished. 
The improvement after hemispherectomy is not limited to seizure control, as there is a comprehensive body of literature showing that early seizure control results in developmental and cognitive gains in most patients undergoing hemispherectomy. This is thought to be a result of removing the negative impact of seizures on the good hemisphere allowing it to "reorganize" its functions due to the plasticity of the brain.
The plasticity is most evident in young children, in whom hemispherectomy is mostly utilized. In fact, it has been shown that the brain in the first few years of life is able to significantly recover major functions such as memory and language after hemispherectomy further supporting the notion that early surgery is strongly recommended when indicated and that it is not a last resort as frequently portrayed to be. However, hemispherectomy can be used in virtually any age including adults with excellent outcomes. A recent study showed that even adults with hemispheric epilepsy can have excellent seizure and cognitive outcomes following hemispherectomy with seizure freedom in 77% of patients.

Results 
Overall, hemispherectomy is a successful procedure. A 1996 study of 52 individuals who underwent the surgery found that 96% of patients experienced reduced or completely ceased occurrence of seizures post-surgery. Studies have found no significant long-term effects on memory, personality, or humor, and minimal changes in cognitive function overall. For example, one case followed a patient who had completed college, attended graduate school and scored above average on intelligence tests after undergoing this procedure at age 5. This patient eventually developed "superior language and intellectual abilities" despite the removal of the left hemisphere, which contains the classical language zones.

When resecting the left hemisphere, evidence indicates that some advanced language functions (e.g., higher order grammar) cannot be entirely assumed by the right side. The extent of advanced language loss is often dependent on the patient's age at the time of surgery. One study following the cognitive development of two adolescent boys who had undergone hemispherectomy found that "brain plasticity and development arise, in part, from the brain's adaption of behavioral needs to fit available strengths and biases…The boy adapts the task to fit his brain more than he adapts his brain to fit the task." Neuroplasticity after hemispherectomy does not imply complete regain of previous functioning, but rather the ability to adapt to the current abilities of the brain in such a way that the individual may still function, however different the new way of functioning may be.

Christina Santhouse (now Paravecchia) underwent a Hemispherectomy on February 13, 1996, performed by Ben Carson when she was eight years old. Previously, she had had Rasmussen's encephalitis, which caused her to experience around 150 seizures a day. After the surgery, her family was told that she would never be able to do many normal activities, such as driving a car or holding a normal job. However, she far surpassed everyone's expectations by going on to earn a master's degree in speech pathology and by getting married and having children of her own.

Traumatic hemispherectomy
There are cases where a person that received major trauma to one side of the brain, such as a gunshot wound, and has required a hemispherectomy and survived. The most notable case is that of Ahad Israfil, who lost the right side of his cerebrum in 1987 in a gun-related work accident. He eventually regained most of his faculties, though he still required a wheelchair. It was noted that reconstructive surgery was difficult due to the gunshot shattering his skull, and he lived with a large indentation on that side of his head.

See also 
 Corpus callosotomy
 Hemispherectomy Foundation

References

Further reading

External links 
 The Deepest Cut by Christine Kenneally, The New Yorker

Neuropsychology
Epilepsy
Surgical removal procedures
Neurosurgical procedures